Benedict Chiajulam Ihesiba Jr. (born April 23, 1992), better known by his stage name OG Maco, is an American rapper from College Park, Georgia.
He is perhaps best known for his 2014 debut single "U Guessed It" which peaked at number 90 on the US Billboard Hot 100. He is signed to Quality Control Music since August 31, 2014, which is managed by Coach K, the former manager of both Gucci Mane and Jeezy and signed to Capitol Music Group/Motown Records since May 20, 2015. He was also chosen as part of XXL magazine's  "2015 Freshman Class".

Early life 
Maco was born on April 23, 1992 in College Park, Georgia. He grew up with friends in a band named Dr. Doctor, in which he participated as a guitarist and singer.

Personal life

Influences 
Maco cites Black Sabbath, Kid Cudi, Future and Curren$y as major influences.

Car crash 
On July 28, 2016, OG Maco was in a near-fatal car crash. Maco suffered multiple skull fractures, cracked vertebrae, a broken orbital, heart palpitations, and almost lost his right eye.

Despite earlier reports, OG Maco never lost his right eye. His eyesight only became extremely distorted, so he had to wear an eye-patch during his subsequent recovery. A few surgical procedures on OG Maco's right eye by his doctors has corrected the eyesight and has proven successful, and OG Maco is still able to see through it. Many earlier reports claimed doctors replaced his apparent blinded eye with a prosthetic one; although these reports were later found to be misinformation or false.

Flesh-eating disease 
OG Maco was diagnosed by doctors as having a flesh eating disease known as necrotizing fasciitis which has left the rapper's face disfigured. OG Maco is currently taking antibiotics for treatment and hoping for a speedy recovery.

Discography

Studio Albums

Extended plays

Mixtapes

Singles

As lead artist

References 

Living people
African-American male rappers
Southern hip hop musicians
Quality Control artists
1992 births
21st-century American rappers
21st-century American male musicians
21st-century African-American musicians